Frederic Van Den Heede (born 21 March 1974) is a Paralympic athlete from Belgium who won a bronze medal in the 2012 Summer Paralympics in the T46 Men's marathon.

References 

Paralympic athletes of Belgium
Athletes (track and field) at the 2008 Summer Paralympics
Athletes (track and field) at the 2012 Summer Paralympics
1974 births
Living people
Paralympic bronze medalists for Belgium
Medalists at the 2012 Summer Paralympics
Belgian male long-distance runners
Paralympic medalists in athletics (track and field)
People from Waregem
Sportspeople from West Flanders